Tuvalu sent a small delegation of table tennis players only to the 2002 Commonwealth Games in Manchester. 2002 marked Tuvalu's second participation in the Commonwealth Games. The tiny Pacific nation did not win any medals.

Medals

Tuvaluans took part in the men's doubles in table tennis, and failed to reach the round of sixteen.

In the men's singles, the country was represented by Alan Puga Resture and Teokila Maleko, who failed to win a medal.

Sources
 Official results

References

Commonwealth Games
Nations at the 2002 Commonwealth Games
2002